American entertainer Jennifer Lopez has embarked on four concert tours, two residencies and has performed various one-off concerts. As of 2021, Lopez has over $248 million lifetime touring gross. She is the 17th highest-grossing female artist this century worldwide (2000-2020) with $232.6 million and 1.7 million tickets sold from 235 shows.

Concert tours

Headlining

Co-headlining

Concert residencies

One-off concerts

Charity events

Music festivals

Sport events

Award shows

Live TV performances

References

 
Jennifer Lopez